Peter Hall (4 December 1927 – 30 May 2014) was a New Zealand cricketer. He played first-class cricket for Cambridge University and Otago between 1948 and 1956.

See also
 List of Otago representative cricketers
 List of Cambridge University Cricket Club players

References

External links
 

1927 births
2014 deaths
New Zealand cricketers
Cambridge University cricketers
Otago cricketers